Noman or nomans may refer to:

People
Noman Bashir, a Pakistani retired Admiral
Noman Benotman, (born 1967), the former head of the Libyan Islamic Fighting Group
Noman Çelebicihan (1885–1918), a Crimean Tatar politician
Noman Habib, a Pakistani actor
Noman Ijaz (born 1965), a Pakistani actor
Noman Masood, a Pakistani actor, director and producer
Noman Mubashir (born 1974), a Norwegian journalist

Toponyms
Nomans River, in Canada
Nomans Land, an island of 640 km off the coast of Martha's Vineyard in Massachusetts

Other 
Noman (novel), a 2007 book by William Nicholson
Noman Group, a Bangladeshi textile company